Jojo Abot is a Ghanaian artist and musician based in Brooklyn, New York. Her creative output spans video direction, acting, modeling, singing and multimedia performance. Abot's work taps into her home country, using her first language, Ewe, as a source to title her work and as a point of origin for musical inspiration. Her musical inspirations include Fela Kuti and Ebo Taylor. Abot has toured and performed with Common, Lauryn Hill, Seun Kuti and Stephen Marley.

Abot's origin story and family history play an important role in her musical work. For instance, her grandmother's name FYFA WOFO inspired the name of her debut album in 2016. FYFA WOFO centers around a narrative in which an African woman becomes pregnant with a white man's child. Abot developed FYFA WOFO into a multimedia project while she participated in NEW INC, the New Museum's incubator for artists, designers and technologists.

Abot's music bends genres and is inspired by jazz, afropunk, hip hop and soul, as well as tribal and indigenous sounds. She is concerned with themes ranging from black empowerment, personal histories, identity and spirituality. Her second EP, NGIWUNKULUNKULU, was released in 2018. NGIWUNKULUNKULU translates to "I am God" in Zulu and is the result of her personal identity exploration in reaction to apartheid's lasting impact in Johannesburg, South Africa. Both NGIWUNKULUNKULU and FYFA WOFO showcase Abot's signature sound and style, which she calls “afro-hypno-sonic,” a blend of Afrobeat, futuristic soul and electronic beats.

In 2018, Abot was a artist in residence at National Sawdust, and on September 24, 2022, National Sawdust hosted the premier of the opera, "A Good of Her Own Making," by Abot and Esperanza Spalding.

References

Further reading 

 
 
 

People from Brooklyn
Ghanaian musicians
Year of birth missing (living people)
Living people